Ghadiya or Ghadia may refer to:

 ghaḍiyā, or ghaṭikā, a Hindu unit of time equal to 24 minutes
 Ghadiya, Gujarat, a village in India

See also 
 Abu Ghadiya, an al-Qaeda militant
 Mohamed Ghadia, handball player, member of the Australia men's national handball team for 2020